Snowbird (Narya) is a superhero appearing in American comic books published by Marvel Comics. Created by John Byrne, the character made her first appearance in The Uncanny X-Men #120 (1979).

Publication history

Snowbird first appeared in Uncanny X-Men #120 (1979) and was created by John Byrne. Byrne later revealed that, unlike most of the Alpha Flight lineup, she was a "fan character" who he created years before he began professional work in comics.

Fictional character biography
Several thousand years before Snowbird's birth, the immensely powerful and malevolent Arctic spirit Tundra sealed the Northern gods — including the Inuit goddess Nelvanna — within a mystical barrier in another dimension, rendering them incapable of defending the mortal realm of Earth. Through clever persuasion and trickery, Nelvanna bargained with Tundra to strip her of her godly powers so that she could pass through the barrier to find and mate with a male human of Earth. Nelvanna appeared before a man named Richard Easton, insisting upon mating with him to produce a child who would grow to battle the evil, mystical "Great Beasts" of Canada. Easton reluctantly agreed, and the two conceived Snowbird some time in the early 20th century, near Resolute Bay, Northwest Territories, Canada. Years later, after having been driven mad by his experiences in the spirit realm, Easton worked a spell to summon and control Tundra and was horribly burned up by the completion of the summoning. He only controlled Tundra for a brief period, and Tundra's manifestation was destroyed by Marrina.

Michael Twoyoungmen, also known as Shaman, was chosen to serve as midwife to Nelvanna when she gave birth. Shaman named the child Narya, used a spell to bind her to the earthly realm, and agreed to raise her in his cabin in the Canadian wilderness. Narya grew at a rapid rate and it was discovered that she possessed supernatural abilities. Most notably, that she could transform into any animal native to Canada, gaining the attributes of that creature while in its guise. In addition, she possesses the ability to fly, to sense mystic and magical power, limited precognition and postcognition, and a limited degree of super-strength. However, she is unable to leave Canada's borders without instantly falling ill, due to the literal effects of the binding spell placed on her by Shaman. As a result of that territorial limitation, she almost died during the fight between Alpha Flight and Omega Flight in New York City, and was unable to pursue the Hulk when he headed south into the U.S. after his fight with Alpha Flight in Vancouver.

Though not much at all is known about Snowbird's childhood, she is believed to have actively engaged in battle against such malevolent Arctic entities as Tundra's kind. Shaman commented that although Snowbird had the body of an adult, it was less than six years since her birth at that point. When Twoyoungmen's friends, James MacDonald Hudson and Heather Hudson, learned of Narya's powers and origin, they asked the two to join the Canadian super team the Flight, later known as Alpha Flight. Narya adopted the codename "Snowbird" on the battlefield and the ordinary identity of "Anne McKenzie" in public. As part of her human identity, she trained to join the Royal Canadian Mounted Police, eventually working as a Records Officer at Yellowknife, Northwest Territories. Snowbird abandoned the secret identity of Anne McKenzie when her new superior, Chief Inspector Hamilton, confined her for her repeated "unexcused absences"—which occurred as a result of her superhero activities—and she was subsequently forced to break out to battle Kolomaq.

During her time with the Canadian ranger forces, Snowbird fell in love with her workmate Douglas Thompson. After she entrusted him with her secret, she married him, and gave birth to a child. For that, she was cast out by the other Inuit gods and stripped of her divine essence. Later, she was possessed by the villain Pestilence, who tried to drain the lives of her teammates after he killed Snowbird's family. In a mine in Burial Butte, a town in the Canadian Klondike, Vindicator killed Snowbird with a plasma blast to prevent Pestilence from taking possession of Snowbird's body. Snowbird's spirit passed into the realm of the Inuit gods, but she refused to enter paradise until the gods would also admit her husband and child, which they eventually did. Pestillence's spirit still possessed Snowbird's body and battled Alpha Flight, but was banished by Heather into the void of Shaman's medicine pouch. The mind of her teammate Walter Langkowski (Sasquatch), who was at that point trapped in Smart Alec's body, was transferred into Snowbird's body, and the body was eventually altered to resemble Walter's own body.

Years later, Snowbird would return from the dead, rising bodily from her grave. She is again an active member of Alpha Flight, and is no longer physically limited to Canada's borders.

Much later, a time-displaced alternate Snowbird from relatively early in her Alpha Flight career was brought to the present-day with her teammates. While most of this group was continuing to act as Alpha Flight in the present day, the temporal copy of Snowbird had married Yukon Jack and become queen of his tribe.

During the Secret Invasion storyline, Snowbird is sent by her uncle Hodiak to be part of a team of gods dubbed the "God Squad", assembled by Hercules to battle the Skrull gods; for if the Skrulls win, then the gods of humanity will be devoured or enslaved. When approached by the new Guardian Michael Pointer, she informs him that, due to Alpha Flight's demise, the end of her marriage, and the loss of the Great Beasts, she will not join the new Omega Flight team. When captured by Nightmare, it is revealed that her greatest fear is survivor's guilt for not being present at the battle between Pointer and Alpha Flight. During a battle with a group of gods who had been absorbed into the Skrull pantheon, Snowbird changes into Neooqtoq the Ravager, deadliest of the Great Beasts of the north. In doing so, she loses her rational mind, attempting to kill anything in her way. She pulls in all the fallen gods and seemingly collapses into herself. However, at the last moment she transformed herself into a swarm of mosquitoes, choosing to honor her fallen teammates by fighting on and rejoins the battle against the Skrull gods and rescues Cho, who has been knocked out of the palace. She returns at a crucial moment and impales the Skrull god Kly'bn on the spine of the slain god-eater Demogorge, eldest child of Gaea, when the Skrull god is knocked back by Hercules. She later carries a weeping Hercules and Amadeus back to Earth in the form of a great white bird. Some time later, she attends Hercules' funeral.

During the Chaos War storyline, Snowbird and Alpha Flight battle Amatusu-Mikaboshi's troops. She only just escapes from the Inuit god's realm before her mother is killed. When she discovers that Sasquatch has brought the Great Beasts to Earth so they can kill Amatsu-Mikaboshi, she is furious and ends up freezing them, after which Mikaboshi impales them.

Powers and abilities
Snowbird possesses a number of powers as a member of the race of superhumans known as the gods of the Native Americans of Arctic Canada. Snowbird is a metamorph who is able to change into a pale white version of any creature native to the Canadian Arctic. She can also transform into a female human being; her true face is not human. In this form, she has blonde hair and blue eyes, but they are usually depicted as being solid black with white pupils. When she transforms, she gains all the strength and special abilities of what she transforms into. For example, if she becomes an owl, she would be able to fly. She can draw additional mass from an unidentified and presumably mystical source when she takes the form of an animal whose mass and volume are greater than her base form; she sheds this mass upon return to human form. When she takes the form of an animal whose mass and volume are less than those of a human being, she becomes a human-sized version of that animal. Some things she has transformed into are a swarm of mosquitoes, a sperm whale, Tanaraq (the true form of Sasquatch), the monster Wendigo, etc. She even transformed into a wolverine and beat Wendigo by ripping him to shreds.

However, Snowbird's personality becomes overlaid with the character traits and instinctual patterns of whatever animal's form she is using at the time. Furthermore, the greater the amount of time she spends as a certain animal, the stronger the impression of that animal's psyche on her personality. If she remains in one form for an extended period of time, she risks having her personality fixed as that of the animal, and therefore of never transforming back. Also, transforming from one animal to another without first changing into her base form causes her great strain. However, both of these limitations have been reduced or removed following her resurrection: she has since been shown to talk in animal form, and she transformed from a mountain lion to Wendigo with no strain at all.

In her base form, Snowbird has superhuman strength, stamina, durability, agility, and reflexes. When she transforms into an animal, she takes the strength and abilities of whatever she transforms into. She also has the ability to fly, but her base form's speed was never stated, and she often assumes the form of a snow owl when she wants to fly. She would also gain the speed of any creature that she transformed into. She has the mental ability to compel others to aid her in her struggle against the Great Beasts, and once mentally controlled Northstar to aid Alpha Flight against them.

After a battle with the Great Beast Kolomaq, Snowbird was badly wounded when suddenly a "healing glow" came over her and all her wounds were instantly healed. This occurs in her base form, but whether she can instantly heal in her other forms is not known. Many years after her death, Alpha Flight found Snowbird in a cylinder in the A.I.M. headquarters. They rescued her and determined that she has an advanced form of cellular rejuvenation. Once she was buried and began to decay, this regeneration process was initiated and carried to fruition over a considerable length of time. This contradicts the fact that currently Sasquatch possesses Snowbird's body, after his was destroyed, and that the body became male. This continuity error has never been addressed.

Snowbird grew to adulthood with unusual rapidity and went through an entire pregnancy in two weeks. She has all the knowledge and wisdom of the gods of the Arctic, but due to her young age she does not know how to fully use it, as she is technically only a few years old. She also has the ability of "postcognition", to envision events that happened up to six hours in the past in her immediate present vicinity. She can replay events in the area, but only she is capable of seeing them. It is unknown if she can do this in forms other than her base form.

Being a mystical creature herself, she can pick up and sense various mystical activities from various places. She has mystical senses enabling her to detect the presence of magical energies or the breaching of a magical field. She can also resist teleportation. Talisman of Alpha Flight tried and failed to teleport her back to their headquarters.

Shaman's binding process initially restricted her from leaving Canada; upon doing so she would become weaker, although she once went to the United States with the X-Men and was not affected. This restriction was temporarily lifted by Hodiak when Snowbird joined the God Squad during Sacred Invasion.

Reception

Accolades 

 In 2019, CBR.com ranked Snowbird 4th in their "10 Most Powerful Members of Canada's Avengers" list.
 In 2020, CBR.com ranked Snowbird 10th in their "10 Most Powerful Canadians In Comics" list.
 In 2022, CBR.com ranked Snowbird 7th in their "13 Most Powerful Marvel Demigods" list.

Other versions

Marvel Zombies
In Marvel Zombies: Dead Days, Snowbird is seen as a zombie attacking Cyclops, but then has a pole stabbed through her brain by Magneto.

Ultimate Marvel
In Ultimate X-Men #94 (July 2008), a Canadian First Nations woman in a white costume named Snowbird attacked the X-Men with the help of the Ultimate version of Alpha Flight. She displayed the ability to fly and to create and control blizzard-like weather patterns. Her abilities allowed her to surprise attack Storm and quickly knock the young mutant out of the sky with a localized blizzard.

In other media

Television

 Snowbird appeared in X-Men: The Animated Series, voiced by Melissa Sue Anderson. In the episode "Repo Man", she displayed her shapeshifting abilities as she assumed the form of a snow owl and a white wolf when trying to capture Wolverine. Snowbird also made a brief appearance in the episode "The Phoenix Saga: Child of Light", where she and the rest of her teammates appear as part of a montage showing heroes rescuing civilians from natural disasters around the globe.

References

External links
Snowbird at Marvel.com

Canadian superheroes
Characters created by John Byrne (comics)
Comics characters introduced in 1979
Fictional aboriginal people in the Polar regions
Fictional characters from Nunavut
Fictional characters with healing abilities
Fictional characters with slowed ageing
Fictional demigods
Fictional goddesses
Fictional indigenous people of the Americas
Fictional Royal Canadian Mounted Police officers
Fictional therianthropes
Marvel Comics characters who are shapeshifters
Marvel Comics characters with superhuman strength
Marvel Comics deities
Marvel Comics female superheroes 
Marvel Comics hybrids
Superheroes who are adopted